Biplob Kumar Sarker (Bengali: বিপ্লব কুমার সরকার; born 16 June 1972) is a Bangladeshi police officer. He is currently Joint Commissioner of Dhaka Metropolitan Police. Earlier he served as Additional Deputy Inspector General (Additional DIG) of Bangladesh Police Dhaka Range. In addition he achieved the title of best DC of DMP several times.

Early life 
Biplob Kumar Sarker was born on 16 June 1972 in Kharampatti of Kishoreganj Sadar Upazila. He passed from University of Dhaka. He was elected general secretary of Jagannath Hall Chhatra League in 1994. During the difficult times of the party, this person who devoted his life to the Awami League has also served jail time several times. He entered in service life as police cadre through 21st BCS.

Career 
Biplob Kumar Sarker entered his working life through 21st BCS. He first joined as ASP of Mohammadpur Zone. On April 6, 2013, he became DC of Tejgaon Zone. On 13 June 2019, he was transferred as Superintendent of Police (SP) of Rangpur District. Later on 18 October 2021, he was reappointed as Deputy Commissioner of Police (DC), Tejgaon Zone of Dhaka Metropolitan Police. He received BPM medal in 2014 and PPM medal in 2016 as state recognition. He got BPM medal again in 2019.  In 2 June, 2022, he was appointed as Additional Deputy Inspector General (Additional DIG) of Bangladesh Police Dhaka Range.In present, he is working as Joint Commissioner of Dhaka Metropolitan Police.

References 

1972 births
Living people
University of Dhaka alumni
Bangladeshi police officers
People from Kishoreganj District